Dana Perry (née Heinz) is an American filmmaker. Together with her husband Hart Perry, she operates Perry Films. She won the Academy Award for Best Documentary (Short Subject) at the 87th Academy Awards for co-producing film Crisis Hotline: Veterans Press 1 (2013); the win was shared with the film's director and co-producer Ellen Goosenberg Kent.<ref>{{cite web|url=https://abcnews.go.com/Entertainment/oscars-2015-dana-perry-us-pay-attention-suicide/story?id=29150634|title=Joi-Marie McKenzie & Emily Shapiro, Oscars 2015: Who Dana Perry Is and Why She Want Us to Pay Attention to Suicide|work=ABC News|date=February 23, 2015|access-date=February 6, 2016}}</ref> She also directed the HBO documentary Boy Interrupted (2009), which addressed the 2005 suicide of her 15-year-old son Evan. Other documentaries include The Drug Years (2006), which won a Stony Award from High Times magazine, And You Don't Stop: 30 Years of Hip-Hop (2004) and Rhythm, Country & Blues'' (1994), which explores the relationship between these musical genres.

References

External links
 
 

American film directors
Place of birth missing (living people)
American film producers
Living people
Year of birth missing (living people)